"Teen Age Prayer" is a song written by Bix Reichner and Bernie Lowe and performed by Gale Storm.  It reached #6 on the U.S. pop chart in 1955.  The song was featured on her 1956 album Gale Storm.

Other charting versions
Gloria Mann featuring the Sid Bass Orchestra released a version of the song which reached #19 on the U.S. pop chart in 1955.
Kitty White released a version of the song which reached #68 on the U.S. pop chart in 1955.

Other versions
Thelma Carpenter released a version of the song as a single in 1961, but it did not chart.
Roberta Shore released a version of the song as a single in 1961, but it did not chart.
Johnny Nash released a version of the song on his 2011 compilation album The Young Johnny Nash Definitive Early Album Collection.

In popular culture
Rachel Sweet sang a version of the song in the 1990 film Cry-Baby.

References

1955 songs
1955 singles
1961 singles
Songs written by Bernie Lowe
Gale Storm songs
Johnny Nash songs
Dot Records singles
Mercury Records singles
Coral Records singles